Doris Kresimon (born 22 March 1955) is a German former footballer who played as a forward. She made seven appearances for the Germany national team from 1982 to 1983.

References

External links
 

1955 births
Living people
German women's footballers
Women's association football forwards
Germany women's international footballers
Footballers from Essen